The 2001–02 BBL season was the 15th season in the history of the British Basketball League. The regular season ran from September 27, 2001, to March 31, 2002, whilst the post-season Play-offs culminated with the Grand Final at Wembley Arena on April 27. Chester Jets claimed a famous "clean-sweep" by winning all three BBL competitions as well as the ntl:home National Cup. Jets' head coach Robbie Peers was awarded the League's Coach of the Year accolade whilst John Thomas, also of the Jets, claimed that Player of the Year award.

London Towers represented the United Kingdom in Europe's most prestigious competition, the Euroleague, however the capital-based team came up against giants Kinder Bologna, FC Barcelona and Union Olimpija in Group B and eventually finished with a 0-14 record. Birmingham Bullets made a brief appearance in the North European Basketball League.

The Manchester Giants franchise, once one of the League's title contenders, were withdrawn from the BBL midway through the season by League officials following ongoing financial difficulties. Prior to withdrawing in December, the Giants had a 2-7 record in the Northern Conference.

Notable occurrences 
 It was announced on December 7, 2001, that the Manchester Giants franchise had been withdrawn by League officials. The team had a 2-7 record in the Northern Conference before being expelled from the competition due to unfulfilling a fixture and a lack of finance.
 The Southern All-Star's claimed the annual All-Star Game with an emphatic 196-142 victory against the Northern All-Stars at the Telewest Arena. Greater London Leopards' Rico Alderson was named as the game's MVP with 34 points and 15 rebounds. Brighton Bears' Albert White lead the game scoring with 38 points.
 The Birmingham Bullets' regular season home match against Edinburgh Rocks on February 2, 2002, was abandoned due to a waterlogged court. Severe heavy rain and a leak in the Aston Villa Leisure Centre roof caused the main court to flood and the game to be postponed.

BBL Championship (Tier 1)

Final standings

Northern Conference

Southern Conference

The play-offs

1st Round

Quarter-finals

Semi-finals

Final

National League Conference (Tier 2)

Final standings 

Play Off Final – Teesside 127 Solent 117 (OT)

National League Division 1 (Tier 3)

Final standings 

Play Off Final – Derbyshire 83 Ealing 81

NTL National Cup

Last 16

Quarter-finals

Semi-finals

Final

BBL Trophy 
This season's BBL Trophy featured all 12 BBL teams. The First round saw all 12 teams split into two groups with the top four finishing teams advancing to the knockout stage.

Group stage 

Group A

Group B

Quarter-finals

Semi-finals

Final

All-Star Game

Statistics leaders

Seasonal awards 

 Most Valuable Player: John Thomas (Chester Jets)
 Coach of the Year: Robbie Peers (Chester Jets)
 Defensive Player of the Year: Brendan Graves (Edinburgh Rocks)
 Most Improved Player: Victor Payne (Milton Keynes Lions)
 Sixth Man Award: Rodger Farrington (Brighton Bears)

References 

British Basketball League seasons
1
British